Joe Roberts (born June 16, 1997) is an American professional motorcycle racer. Roberts competes in the FIM Moto2 World Championship with Italtrans Racing Team aboard a Kalex chassis bike.

Career

Early career
Roberts' introduction to motorcycles was at a young age. He first rode a 50 cc motorcycle just shy of his 4th birthday. Roberts's earliest competition was in youth flat track and Supermoto. From there he transitioned to mini-road racing on kart tracks and then to full sized tracks on a Honda RS125. He competed successfully for two seasons in the USGPRU (United States Grand Prix Racer's Union) finishing 3rd in points in 125GP in 2010. At the end of 2010 he was invited to the Red Bull MotoGP Rookies Cup try-outs for the 2011 season and was one of 12 selected from 100 applicants.

Roberts spent 3 seasons (2011–2013) with the Red Bull Rookies. In his first season he recorded a win and a track record at Brno, a track he had never seen before. He improved his results in 2012 with best finishes of 2nd, 4th, 5th and was one of very few riders to be invited back for a 3rd year in 2013 to ride the new KTM Moto3 bike. Roberts showed good promise on the 4 stroke machine leading races in Jerez, Brno and Silverstone but some bad luck saw him fail to finish a number of races which lowered his final standing. That same year, just 6 days after his 16th birthday, he competed back in the US in the AMA aboard a Honda CBR600RR, recording a sensational double win at Barber Motorsports, setting a record for the youngest win in AMA Pro Road racing. He won again at Laguna Seca and scored another double win at Miller Motorsports Park, thereby scoring 5 wins from the 5 AMA races he entered.

In 2014 he returned full-time to the US to ride for Team Hammer in AMA Daytona Sportbike on a Honda CBR600RR. However, the combination of an uncompetitive package and some injuries meant he wasn't able to continue his run of success from 2013. For 2015, Roberts returned to his winning ways aboard a Yamaha R6 in the new AMA/FIM MotoAmerica Stock600 class with 9 wins and a 2nd from 11 starts, sealing the championship at Laguna Seca, before the final round of the series at New Jersey, where he moved up to the Supersport class. There, he dominated practice and qualifying, had a runaway victory in Race 1 and finished a close second in Race 2.  Finishing 3rd in Superprestigio in Las Vegas at the end of the year. 2016 saw him compete in AMA/MotoAmerica Supersport on a Yamaha R6 where he climbed the podium 3 times and scored 3 pole positions. He was unfortunately forced to miss several races due to injury.

Moto2 World Championship

AGR Team (2017)

2017 
In 2017 Roberts returned to Europe to compete in the FIM CEV Moto2 class with the AGRteam. Mid-year due to his strong performance on the Kalex machine, he was invited by AGR to join the World Championship Moto2 team and made a sensational debut in Brno coming from 29th on the grid to finish 10th in his first race at the world level.

NTS RW Racing GP (2018)

2018 
In 2018, he competed in Moto2 riding for NTS Racing GP.

American Racing (2019–2020)

2019 
From 2019 season, Roberts riding for the American Racing.

2020 
In  Roberts qualified on pole position at the opening round of the season, becoming the first American rider to do so since Ben Spies  at the 2010 Indianapolis motorcycle Grand Prix and the first one in Moto2 since Kenny Noyes at the 2010 French motorcycle Grand Prix. He finished the race in fourth, after never having finished better than 13th over the previous two seasons. He would qualify for pole again in the fourth round and finished the race in third, becoming the first American driver on the podium since Spies at the 2011 Valencian Community motorcycle Grand Prix and the first in mid class since John Kocinski at the 1993 Dutch TT. A documentary was made by Dorna following Roberts and American Racing titled Behind The Stars And Stripes.

After the 2020 season Roberts was seen as a hot commodity in the Grand Prix World Championship. Roberts was offered not only deals with multiple front running teams on the Moto2 grid but was even offered a MotoGP ride with Aprilia to partner Aleix Espargaro in 2021, a move that was endorsed not only by Roberts manager and American Racing team principal Eitan Bitbul but also his mentor John Hopkins and was even endorsed by Espargaro himself.

Italtrans Racing Team (2021–present)

2021 
Roberts ultimately declined the offer to move up to MotoGP for Aprilia upon consulting with Ducati rider Andrea Dovizioso and instead chose to race for Italtrans Racing Team, whom Moto2 series champion Enea Bastianini raced for before moving up to MotoGP himself.

Italtrans Racing announced on September 27, 2021, that they had resigned Roberts for another season. Roberts suffered a broken collarbone at Misano on October 22, 2021, and underwent surgery the following Tuesday, forcing him to miss the last two rounds of the 2021 season.

Career statistics

Grand Prix motorcycle racing

By season

By class

Races by year
(key) (Races in bold indicate pole position; races in italics indicate fastest lap)

 Half points awarded as less than two thirds of the race distance (but at least three full laps) was completed.

References

External links 

1997 births
Living people
American motorcycle racers
Moto2 World Championship riders
Motorcycle racers from Los Angeles